El Biodh (Arabic: البيوض) is a municipality in Naâma Province, Algeria. It is part of Mécheria District and has a population of 3.776, which gives it 7 seats in the PMA. Its postal code is 45110 and its municipal code is 4509.

Populated places in Naâma Province
Naâma Province